Aperantia is a former municipality in Evrytania, Greece. Since the 2011 local government reform it is part of the municipality Agrafa, of which it is a municipal unit. The municipal unit has an area of 175.823 km2. Population 1,739 (2011). The seat of the municipality was in Granitsa.

Ancient Aperanteia (Ἀπεραντεία) was a town and small region of ancient Aetolia, south of Dolopia.

References

Populated places in Evrytania